The Nikon Chronicle is a compilation of Russian chronicles undertaken at the court of Ivan the Terrible in the mid-16th century. The compilation was named after Patriarch of Moscow and all Rus' Nikon, who owned a copy. In the 18th century it was published under the name The Russian Chronicle According to Nikon's Manuscript.

The chronicle covers the years from 859 to 1520, with additional information for 1521–1558, as well as many detailed tales about the most important events, such as "Tale of the Battle of the Neva", "Tale of the Battle of the Ice", "Tale of the Tokhtamysh Invasion", "Tale of the Death of Mikhail of Tver," etc. Some of these tales have obvious parallels with Russian folklore and Orthodox hagiography.

The chronicle contains a large number of facts not found in earlier sources. Some of these interpolations are thought to reflect a political ideology of the nascent Tsardom of Russia. The 12th-century Polovtsy and the 16th-century Kazan Tatars, for instance, are regularly conflated.

References

Publications
Руская летопись по Никонову списку. / Изданная под смотрением имп. Академии наук. СПб, 1767–1792. (Russian Cronicle According to Nikon's Copy. Published under the supervidion of the Russian Academy of Sciences, St. Petersburg, 1767–1792)  Ч.1, Ч.2, Ч.3, Ч.4, Ч.5, Ч.6, Ч.7, Ч.8
The Complete Collection of Russian Chronicles, vols. IX-XIV, editions of 1863, 1918, 2000

East Slavic chronicles
16th-century history books